Catherine of Poděbrady (11 November 1449 – 8 March 1464) was Queen of Hungary as the second wife of King Matthias Corvinus.

Biography

Catherine and her twin sister Sidonie were born at Poděbrady, to the Bohemian king George of Poděbrady and his first wife, Kunigunde of Šternberk. Kunigunde died from complications of the birth.  George of Poděbrady eventually remarried; his second wife, Joanna of Rožmitál, bore George more children, including Ludmila of Poděbrady.

Matthias Corvinus had lost his wife, Elisabeth of Cilli, at a young age. On 1 May 1461 he married Catherine at Matthias Church in Buda. Matthias was eighteen, his bride thirteen. The wedding negotiations had begun in 1458 when Catherine was nine years old. Soon after the marriage, Catherine left her family and went to live in Hungary with her new husband. Janus Pannonius helped teach Catherine Latin.

The queen died in childbirth at the age of 14. Her child died as well. The event caused Matthias to lose hope of siring a legitimate heir. He eventually married Beatrice of Naples, but that marriage also failed to produce an heir. Matthias's only surviving offspring was an illegitimate son, John Corvinus, by his mistress Barbara Edelpöck.

References

Bibliography

1449 births
1464 deaths
15th-century Bohemian people
15th-century Hungarian people
15th-century Bohemian women
15th-century Hungarian women
Hungarian queens consort
Podiebrad family
Hunyadi family
Hungarian people of Czech descent
People from Poděbrady
Deaths in childbirth